Arthur Moren Boutillier (October 16, 1869 – February 24, 1955) was a Canadian farmer and  federal politician.

Boutillier was elected to the House of Commons of Canada under the Progressive banner. He defeated Liberal candidate Gorden Charles by a wide plurality. Boutillier did not run for re-election when Parliament dissolved in 1926.

Boutillier's son, Herbert R. Boutillier, was a Co-operative Commonwealth Federation candidate in the 1940 federal election. In 1955 he died in Edmonton, where he had moved after retiring in 1947.

References

 

1869 births
1955 deaths
People from Halifax, Nova Scotia
Members of the House of Commons of Canada from Alberta
Progressive Party of Canada MPs
Farmers from Alberta